Thala Island is the southern of two small, rocky islands lying just off the northwest edge of Davis Ice Piedmont, along the north coast of Victoria Land. Named by ANARE (Australian National Antarctic Research Expeditions) after , one of two expedition ships used by ANARE in 1962 to explore this area. The ship Thala Dan is in turn named after the mother-in-law of Knud Hansen, an employee at Danish J. Lauritzen A/S in the 1950s. She was the first Danish woman to be named Thala, as the name was previously spelled Tale. The name Thala (Tale) is a Scandinavian version of the German name Adelheid or Sankta Adelheid.

See also 
 List of antarctic and sub-antarctic islands

Islands of Victoria Land
Pennell Coast